Iceland's first ambassador to Norway was Pétur Benediktsson in 1942. Iceland's current ambassador to Norway is Ingibjörg Davíðsdóttir.

List of ambassadors

See also
Iceland–Norway relations
Foreign relations of Iceland
Ambassadors of Iceland

References
List of Icelandic representatives (Icelandic Foreign Ministry website) 

1942 establishments
Main
Norway
Iceland